Cloudy Bay is located at the southernmost end of Bruny Island in the Australian state of Tasmania.

Shore-based whaling stations operated in the bay in the 1830s.

Home to a vast range of native Australian wild life, Cloudy Bay is a hidden and quiet paradise nestled inside the South Bruny National Park. The bay consists of a 5 kilometre long beach which, at one end, offers waves which are suitable only for experienced surfers and, at the other, a peaceful camping location complete with toilet facilities.

References

Southern Tasmania
Bays of Tasmania
Bruny Island
Whaling stations in Australia
South Bruny National Park